Gottenheim is an independent village at the northern tip of the Tuniberg, 15 km west of Freiburg im Breisgau. It is located in the administrative region Breisgau-Hochschwarzwald in the federal state of Baden-Württemberg, Germany.

Situated at an altitude of 207 m in one of the warmest regions of Germany, Gottenheim has a population of 2,912.

The total area of Gottenheim is 2183 acres (8.83 km²), which includes  of vines,  alluvial forest and some acres of half-bog.

History
Gottenheim was first officially mentioned in 1086.

Economy and Infrastructure

The Breisgau S-Bahn operated Breisachbahn railway line connects Gottenheim station to Breisach in the west and the national railway system (Deutsche Bahn) via Freiburg im Breisgau in the east. The Kaiserstuhlbahn connects Gottenheim to Endingen and the towns, Riegel am Kaiserstuhl, Nimburg and Bötzingen, which lay in between.

By car Gottenheim can be reached via German Autobahn A5, Frankfurt-Basel, using exit No.62 Freiburg-Mitte towards Umkirch and following signs.

Culture and sights

Festivals
 Gottenheim Hahlerai-fest (local wine and food festival) every second year in autumn

References

External links
Official homepage of Gottenheim
  Gottenheim - pictures & history 
Wine festival Gottenheim (all even years in beginning of September)
Aerial views of Gottenheim
Sports club Gottenheim

Breisgau-Hochschwarzwald
Baden